CI-1017 is a muscarinic acetylcholine receptor agonist which is selective for and is approximately equipotent at the M1 and M4 receptors, with 20-30-fold lower affinity for the M2, M3, and M5 subtypes It is the (R)-enantiomer of the racemic compound PD-142,505.

In animals CI-1017 improves learning and memory and increases the electrical activity of the hippocampus through activation of the M1 receptor, while minimally producing parasympathetic side effects and only at very high doses. It also inhibits production of amyloidogenic A beta peptide and increases secretion of soluble amyloid precursor protein via stimulation of the M1 receptor as well. Based on these data, it was hypothesized that CI-1017 could not only treat the symptoms of Alzheimer's disease, but could also potentially slow its progression. It was tested in clinical trials for this purpose in the early 2000s but was abandoned due to lack of efficacy.

References 

Muscarinic agonists
Ketoximes
Abandoned drugs